Hulodes donata is a moth of the family Erebidae. It is found in the Indian subregion, Burma, Thailand, Sundaland, the Philippines, Sulawesi, New Guinea and Australia.

The larvae feed on Xylia species.

References

External links

Species info

Moths described in 1907
Hulodes